Alex Valderrama Pinedo (born 1 October 1960), nicknamed Didi, is a Colombian former footballer who played as a forward. He made 20 appearances scoring five goals for the Colombia national team from 1979 to 1985. He was also part of Colombia's squad for the 1979 Copa América tournament.

References

External links
 
 

1960 births
Living people
People from Santa Marta
Colombian footballers
Association football forwards
Colombia international footballers
Unión Magdalena footballers
Millonarios F.C. players
Atlético Junior footballers
Atlético Nacional footballers
Deportivo Táchira F.C. players
Colombian expatriate footballers
Colombian expatriate sportspeople in Venezuela
Expatriate footballers in Venezuela
Sportspeople from Magdalena Department